United Nations Security Council resolution 1005, was a unanimously-adopted resolution on 17 July 1995, after recalling resolutions 918 (1994) and 997 (1995) on the situation in Rwanda. The Council noted the hazards posed by land mines and, acting under Chapter VII of the United Nations Charter, authorised appropriate amounts of explosives to be used exclusively for demining programmes in the country.

The Council noted the will of the Government of Rwanda to address the issue of unexploded land mines and the interest of other states to assist with the destruction of the land mines in Rwanda. It underlined the importance the Council placed on efforts to eliminate the threat posed by unexploded land mines in several countries and the nature of humanitarian demining programmes.

It was recognised that the demining process would require the use of explosives. The explosives could be provided to Rwanda despite the arms embargo imposed on the country, with prior approval from the Committee of the Security Council established in Resolution 918.

See also
 List of United Nations Security Council Resolutions 1001 to 1100 (1995–1997)
 Rwandan Civil War
 Rwandan genocide
 United Nations Assistance Mission for Rwanda
 United Nations Observer Mission Uganda–Rwanda

References

External links
 
Text of the Resolution at undocs.org

 1005
1995 in Rwanda
Rwandan genocide
 1005
July 1995 events